South Philippine Adventist College (or SPAC) is a private, co-educational college that started as an elementary school in 1950, transitioned into a high school in 1952, and finally became a college in 1993. It is a part of the Seventh-day Adventist education system, the world's second largest Christian school system.

History
SPAC began its operation in Digos, Davao del Sur in 1950, as an elementary school. It became a junior high school in 1952, with an enrollment of 236. It was then called Southern Mindanao Academy (SMA). Soon, overcrowding necessitated the transfer to a larger area in Barrio Camanchiles, Matanao, Davao del Sur, which was finally achieved in 1958.

The 20 hectares of land were purchased through the efforts of Ruperto Sumicad Sr., at a cost of ₱7,000.00, with contributions from Frank La Sage and his wife, and from the Southern Mindanao Mission (SMM). The Far Easter Division also allocated ₱40,000.00 and the South Philippine Union Mission gave ₱20,000.00 for the construction of the school building. The first principal of SMA was Pastor Jose M. Atil.

In the summer of 1993 during the Teacher Secondary Convention in Mountain View College (MVC), the then principal of SMA, Jimmy Faderogaya, together with Dr. Milton Thorman, met with the South Philippine Union Conference (SPUC) president, Pastor Paterno Diaz, and discussed the possibility of converting SMA into a college.

Dr. Shozo Tabuchi, the commencement speaker during the March 1993 graduation of SMA, also discussed with the SMM Board, chaired by Pastor Vicente S. Paypa, the possibility of making a feasibility study, which was immediately accomplished.  Alberto D. Alojado, the SMA treasurer was delegated to bring it to Bacolod City during the board meeting.

Pastor Diaz then requested the SPUC Educational Director, Dr. Jonathan C. Catolico, to organize an evaluating team. Dr. Gerundio U. Ellacer, a former president of MVC, headed the survey team. The members were Dr. Remelito A. Tabingo, then President of MVC, Abraham O. Neri, Epifanio N. Ciron, SS Geviera, and Dr. Catolico.

On November 4, 1993, the evaluating team recommended to the SPUC Executive Committee that SMA be converted to a college. The required documents for the Commission on Higher Education (CHEd) and the Securities and Exchange Commission (SEC) were processed. The General Conference Department of Education, headed by Dr. Agripino Segovia, also a former president of MVC, together with Dr. Eager and Dr. Oliver Koh, approved the conversion of SMA to a college, to be known as the South Philippine Adventist College—the second Adventist college in Mindanao.

The CHEd personnel who came to SPAC were Dr. Minerva Fabros, Engr. Louie Perez, Mrs. Realina Dela Peña, Mrs. Zenaida Turtogo, and Mr. Feliciano Tamondong. They were under the supervision of Dr. Glory Magdale, Dr. Eloisa Paderanga and Mrs. Severina Villarin. The CHEd permit to operate and the SEC certificates were received during the same occasion. The first president of SPAC was Dr. Jonathan C. Catolico (1993-1996).

Courses offered
Bachelor of Science in Computer Science
Bachelor of Arts in Theology
Bachelor of Science in Office Administration
Bachelor of Secondary Education Major in Math
Bachelor of Secondary Education Major in English
Bachelor of Elementary Education Major in Pre-school Education
Bachelor of Elementary Education - Generalist
Bachelor of Science in Business Administration
Bachelor of Science in Accountancy

Presidents
Jonathan C. Catolico (1993 - 1996)
Jimmy F. Faderogaya (1996 #1st semester)
Ildefonso F. Faigmani (1996 #2nd semester - 2004)
Chliejvferwyn C. Catolico (2004 - 2006)
Benonie P. Llanto (2006 - 2008)
Chliejvferwyn C. Catolico (2008 - 2010)
Arceli H. Rosario (2010 - 2012)
Yolando A. Queruela (2012 - December 2013)
Chliejvferwyn C. Catolico (2013–present)

See also

 List of Seventh-day Adventist colleges and universities
 Seventh-day Adventist education

References

External links

Universities and colleges affiliated with the Seventh-day Adventist Church
Adventist universities and colleges in the Philippines
Universities and colleges in Davao del Sur
Educational institutions established in 1993
1993 establishments in the Philippines